ι Persei, Latinized as Iota Persei, is a single star in the northern constellation Perseus. This object is visible to the naked eye as a faint, yellow-white hued point of light with an apparent visual magnitude of 4.1. It is located 34 light years from the Sun based on parallax, and is drifting further away with a radial velocity of +49 km/s. Iota Persei has a relatively high proper motion across the sky.

This is a late F- or early G-type main-sequence star with a stellar classification of around G0V. It is about 3–4 billion years old and is spinning slowly with a projected rotational velocity of 4 km/s. The star has 1.4 times the mass of the Sun and 1.4 times the Sun's radius. It is radiating more than double the luminosity of the Sun from its photosphere at an effective temperature of 5,963 K.

There is a 12.4-magnitude line-of-sight companion star that is not believed to be gravitationally associated with Iota Persei.



Naming

References

External links 
 
 
 

F-type main-sequence stars
G-type main-sequence stars
Persei, Iota

Persei, Iota
Perseus (constellation)
Durchmusterung objects
0124
019373
019373
0937